Vladislav Morozov (born 12 October 2000) is a Belarusian professional footballer who plays for Dinamo Minsk.

References

External links 
 
 

2000 births
Living people
Sportspeople from Brest, Belarus
Belarusian footballers
Belarus under-21 international footballers
Association football forwards
FC Dynamo Brest players
FC Rukh Brest players
FC Isloch Minsk Raion players
FC Dinamo Minsk players